Andrei Veniaminovich Lapushkin (born 9 November 1965) is a former Russian professional football player.

Club career
He made his Russian Football National League debut for FC Smena-Saturn Saint Petersburg on 3 April 1993 in a game against FC Asmaral Kislovodsk. He played 3 seasons in the FNL for Saturn.

Honours
 Russian Second Division Zone 4 top scorer: 1992 (25 goals).

External links
 

1965 births
Footballers from Saint Petersburg
Living people
Soviet footballers
Russian footballers
Association football forwards
FC Zenit Saint Petersburg players
FC Lantana Tallinn players
FC Dynamo Saint Petersburg players
Meistriliiga players
Russian expatriate footballers
Expatriate footballers in Estonia
Russian expatriate sportspeople in Estonia